Tadini may refer to:
 Tadini, a village in Kaštelir-Labinci municipality in Istria County, Croatia
 Tadini (ophthalmologist), an 18th-century Italian ophthalmologist
 Alessandro Tadini (b. 1973), an Italian professional golfer
 Arcangelo Tadini (1846 – 1912), an Italian Roman Catholic priest and saint

See also 
 Accademia di Belle Arti Tadini, in Lovere, Province of Bergamo, Italy